Stephen Paul Martinson (born June 21, 1959) is an American former professional ice hockey player and coach. He played 49 games in the National Hockey League with the Detroit Red Wings, Montreal Canadiens, and Minnesota North Stars between 1987 and 1992. The rest of his playing career, which lasted from  1981 to 1996, was spent in various minor leagues. After retiring as a player he turned to coaching, and his 1,123 career professional coaching wins are the most ever for an American born ice hockey head coach.

Playing career
Martinson's college career includes playing the 1977–78 and 1978–79 seasons with the St. Cloud State Huskies. Between 1981 and 1986, he played in the International Hockey League and Central Hockey League for the Toledo Goaldiggers (IHL), Salt Lake Golden Eagles (IHL), Birmingham South Stars (CHL), and the Tulsa Oilers (CHL). While with the Tulsa Oilers in the 1983–84 season, the team suspended operations on February 16, 1984, playing only road games for the final six weeks of the season. Despite this adversity, the team went on to win the league's championship, the Adams Cup, his only championship as a player.

After playing parts of the next four seasons in the American Hockey League, mostly with the Hershey Bears and Adirondack Red Wings, Martinson played his first National Hockey League game, with the Detroit Red Wings, in the 1987–88 season. Martinson went on to play fifty NHL games with the Red Wings, Montreal Canadiens, and Minnesota North Stars over parts of four seasons while mostly playing with those teams' AHL or IHL affiliates. He retired early into the 1994–95 season, although he made a few more on-ice appearances early into his coaching career with the Fresno Falcons and San Diego Gulls.

Coaching career
Martinson's first head coaching job was with the San Diego Gulls of the West Coast Hockey League in 1995. Martinson was hired as the team's first head coach after playing for the former Gulls team that played in the IHL. He had immediate success in the newly formed league and the WCHL Gulls won the first three league championships, the Taylor Cup, in 1996, 1997, and 1998. He coached the Gulls for nine of the team's eleven seasons, winning two more Taylor Cups, in 2001 and 2003.

After one season of coaching the Gulls after the team joined the ECHL in 2003, Martinson left the organization to become the head coach of the Rockford IceHogs in the United Hockey League in 2004. He stayed with the IceHogs for three seasons, winning the league championship in 2007. During that season, Martinson ordered a line of enforcers to assault players on the Fort Wayne Komets. One of those players, 43-year-old Konstitin Shafronov, contemplated retirement due to the acts of Martinson and the IceHogs.

Martinson then left the IceHogs after the championship season to become the head coach of the Elmira Jackals in their first season in the ECHL in 2007. With the Jackals, his teams qualified for the playoffs every season following multiple years of no postseasons before he was hired.

In 2010, Martinson left the Jackals to become the inaugural head coach of the expansion Chicago Express in the ECHL. However, the Express did not take the ice until 2011 would end up only playing one season in 2011–12.

After the Express folded in 2012, Martinson became the head coach of the Allen Americans in the Central Hockey League. His teams once again had immediate success winning the 2013 and 2014 Ray Miron President's Cup for the CHL's playoff championships. The Americans joined the ECHL in 2014 and continued to have success, winning the league championship Kelly Cup after their first two seasons, in 2015 and 2016. Martinson’s contract was not renewed by Allen following the 2021-22 season. 

Over his multi-stop coaching career Martinson won a total of ten championships in four North American ice hockey leagues, including five with the San Diego Gulls (1996, 1997, 1998, 2001, 2003) in the West Coast Hockey League, four with the Allen Americans in the Central Hockey League (2013, 2014) and the ECHL (2015, 2016), along with one with the Rockford IceHogs in the United Hockey League (2007). Martinson is the first American-born coach to win 1,000 games as a head coach, having completed the 2021-22 season with 1,123 wins.

Career statistics

Regular season and playoffs

References

External links
 

1957 births
Living people
Adirondack Red Wings players
American men's ice hockey right wingers
Birmingham South Stars players
Detroit Red Wings players
Hershey Bears players
Houston Aeros (1994–2013) players
Ice hockey coaches from Minnesota
Ice hockey players from Minnesota
Minnesota North Stars players
Montreal Canadiens players
New Haven Nighthawks players
People from Minnetonka, Minnesota
St. Cloud State Huskies men's ice hockey players
San Diego Gulls (IHL) players
San Diego Gulls (WCHL) players
Sherbrooke Canadiens players
Sunshine Hockey League players
Toledo Goaldiggers players
Tulsa Oilers (1964–1984) players
Undrafted National Hockey League players